The Order of Merit of the Prussian Crown (Verdienstorden der Preußischen Krone) was an award of civil and military merit established 18 January 1901 by King Wilhelm II on the occasion of the bicentennial of the establishment of the Kingdom of Prussia. The order was presented in one class and consisted of a badge and a breast star. For military merit the award was presented with crossed swords. The order was presented once with diamonds.

Description of the award
The order consists of a badge, worn on a sash from right shoulder to the left hip, and a star worn on the left chest:

The badge of the order is a blue-enamelled, eighteen-karat, yellow-gold Maltese cross with a granular border.  In each of the compartments between the four arms of the cross is a red-enamelled crown surmounting the royal monogram ("W II", for Wilhelm II). The central disc on the obverse of the badge shows a golden crown with red enamel, surrounded by a blue-enamelled circular band bearing the gold-lettered motto, "Gott Mit Uns".  The disc on the reverse bears the intertwined initials "IR W II" (for "Imperator Rex Wilhelm II":  "Emperor King William II"), encircled by the date "18 January 1901".

The star of the order is a golden eight-pointed star with straight rays, displaying the central disc from the obverse of the badge.

The sash of the order is blue, edged with orange stripes.

Awards
The medal was awarded only 57 times. General von Gossler was the only person who received the awards in both departments.

Recipients
 King William II of Prussia on 18 January 1901
 Prince Albert of Prussia, Regent of the Duchy of Braunschweig on 18 January 1901
 Baron Walter von Loë, Prussian colonel general of cavalry and adjutant general on 18 January 1901
 Count Vladimir Lamsdorf, Russian Minister of Foreign Affairs on 21 September 1901
 Count Paul von Hatzfeldt zu Wildenburg, German Ambassador to London, on 8 November 1901
 Küçük Mehmet Sait Pasha Ottoman Grand Vizier on 24 May 1902
 Crown Prince Vajiravudh of Siam, on 30 May 1902, during a visit to Berlin
 Giulio Prinetti, Italian Foreign Minister, in late August 1902, during the visit to Germany of King Victor Emmanuel III of Italy
 Otto von Berg Strub, Prussian general of infantry, 21 October 1902
 Prince Hermann von Hatzfeldt zu Trachenberg, Prussian Chief President on 22 June 1903
 Konrad Ernst von Gossler, Prussian general of infantry on 14 August 1903
 Arthur Freiherr von Bolfras, Austrian field-marshal and Adjutant General on 18 September 1903
 Count Uexküll-Gyllenband, Austrian general and commander of the 2nd Cavalry Corps on 18 September 1903
 Count of Abensperg and Traun, Austrian Colonel-Kämmerer 19 September 1903
 Count Károly Khuen-Héderváry, Hungarian Prime Minister on 19 September 1903
 Henry Lascelles, British Ambassador in Berlin on 30 June 1904
 Damat Ferid Pasha, Ottoman Grand Vizier on 24 September 1904
 Eberhardt zu Solms-Sonnewalde, Prussian Ambassador 18 October 1904
 Albert von Mischke, Prussian general and adjutant general of the infantry on 18 October 1904
 Edler von der Planitz, Austrian general of the Cavalry and Inspector General of Cavalry, on 24 April 1905
 Strukoff, Russian General of Cavalry and Adjutant General on 4 June 1905
 Count August zu Eulenburg, Prussian Minister of State on 2 July 1905
 Graf zu Castell-Castell, Bavarian Lieutenant-General and High Steward on 14 November 1905
 Baron Max Wladimir von Beck, Austrian Prime Minister on 22 June 1906
 Sándor Wekerle, Hungarian Prime Minister on 22 June 1906
 Fiedler, Austrian artillery commander and commanding general of First Army Corps on 7 May 1908
 Leopold Graf Gudenus, Austrian Colonel-eunuch on 7 May 1908
 Graf Cziráky von Czirák und Dénesfalva, Austrian Obersthofmarschall on 7 May 1908
 Arvid Lindman, Swedish Prime Minister on 3 August 1908
 Hemming Gadd, Swedish general of the infantry on 3 August 1908
 Max von Hausen, Saxon Infantry General and Minister of State on 10 September 1908
 Ahmed Tevfik Pasha, Ottoman Marshal on 10 September 1908
 Julius von Verdy du Vernois, Prussian general of infantry on 1 March 1909
 Pyotr Arkadyevitch Stolypin, Russian Prime Minister on 17 June 1909
 Count Franz Conrad von Hötzendorf, head of the Austrian General Staff on 9 September 1909
 Franz Freiherr von Schoen Aich, Austrian Infantry General and Minister of War on 9 September 1909
 Carl von Horn, Bavarian Infantry General and Minister of War on 17 September 1909
 Wilhelm von Linden-Suden, Prussian general of infantry on 7 April 1911
 Hermann von Blomberg, Prussian general of infantry on 13 September 1911
 Georg von Kleist, Prussian general of the cavalry on 6 April 1912
 Jules Greindl, Belgian Minister of State on 24 May 1912
 Sergei Dmitrievich Sazonov, Russian Foreign Minister on 4 July 1912
 Hans von Kirchbach, Saxon general of the artillery on 13 September 1912
 Prince Katsura Tarō, major Japanese Privy Seal on 19 September 1912
 Peter von Wiedenmann, Bavarian Artillery General and Adjutant General on 19 December 1912
 Maximilian von Seinsheim, Bavarian Court on 19 December 1912
 Victor von Podbielski, Prussian Minister of State on 16 June 1913
 Walter Reinhold von Mossner, Prussian general of the cavalry on 16 June 1913
 Clemens von Delbrück, Prussian Minister of State on 24 June 1914
 Baron von Hammerstein-Loxten, Prussian general of infantry on 12 May 1917
 Reinhold Krämer, Prussian Secretary of the Post Office on 6 August 1917
 General Paul von Ploetz, Prussian general of infantry on 13 March 1918

Recipients with swords
 Kanin, Prince of Japan on 22 March 1906
 Prince Ōyama Iwao, Marquis and Japanese Marshal on 22 March 1906
 Karl Ludwig d'Elsa, Saxon Colonel General on 2 January 1917
 Ernst Konrad von Gossler, Prussian general of infantry on 10 February 1917
 Ernst von Hoiningen, Prussian general of infantry on 6 March 1917

Recipients with diamonds
 Maximilian von Seinsheim, Bavarian Court on 15 December 1913

References

Bibliography
 Jörg Nimmergut: Deutsche Orden und Ehrenzeichen bis 1945. Band 2. Limburg – Reuss. Zentralstelle für wissenschaftliche Ordenskunde, München 1997, .
 Kurt-Gerhard Klietmann: Der Verdienstorden der Preußischen Krone, Mitteilung aus dem Institut für Wissenschaftliche Ordenskunde, Der Herold - Band 12, 32. Jahrgang 1989, Heft 9

Orders, decorations, and medals of Prussia
Orders of chivalry of Germany
Kingdom of Prussia
Awards established in 1901
1901 establishments in Germany